The Xu Zizhi Tongjian Changbian ("Extended Continuation to Zizhi Tongjian") is an 1183 Chinese history book by Li Tao which chronicles the history of Northern Song Dynasty (960–1127). The book took Li Tao about 40 years to complete and was finally published in 1183 with 980 chapters (excluding 68 chapters of summary, 5 chapters of general catalogue, and 10 chapters of compilation accounts). However, only 520 chapters are extant. As the sequel to Sima Guang's landmark work Zizhi Tongjian ("Comprehensive Mirror to Aid in Government"), it follows the same format, but is not as concise and refined.

References

Chinese history texts
12th-century history books
Song dynasty literature
1180s books
1183 in Asia
History books about the Song dynasty
12th-century Chinese books